Mesny is a French surname. Notable people with the surname include:

Gustave Mesny (1886–1945), French Army general and war crime victim of the Second World War
William Mesny (1842–1919), adventurer and writer from Jersey

French-language surnames